The 1974 La Flèche Wallonne was the 38th edition of La Flèche Wallonne cycle race and was held on 11 April 1974. The race started and finished in Verviers. The race was won by Frans Verbeeck of the Watney team.

General classification

Notes

References

1974 in road cycling
1974
1974 in Belgian sport
1974 Super Prestige Pernod